Old Fort Pierce Park is the site of Fort Pierce, a military installation constructed by the U.S. Army in Florida with the purpose of being a main supply depot for the army during the Second Seminole War. The modern town of Fort Pierce derives its name from this installation.

Fort Pierce, named for its first commander Benjamin Kendrick Pierce, was built in 1838 as a defensive position in the Second Seminole War. During the war, then second-lieutenant William Tecumseh Sherman was stationed at Fort Pierce. It was abandoned in 1842 at the end of the war and burned down the following year.

Today, the site is a park along the Indian River. The park is also the site of an ancient burial mound of the Ais Indian tribe which extended from Cape Canaveral to the Saint Lucie inlet.

This site once had a natural spring which made it a popular location for the Ais Indians and later for Spanish sailors who would stop here occasionally to refill their water jars before making the transatlantic crossing back to Spain. (1500-1750) It is not uncommon to find Spanish relics mixed with Indian potsherds in the river at that location.

References

External links
St. Lucie County listings, Florida's Office of Cultural and Historical Programs
Ais Indians
 Old Fort Park 360 tour

Fort Pierce, Florida
Parks in St. Lucie County, Florida
National Register of Historic Places in St. Lucie County, Florida
Seminole Wars
Forts on the National Register of Historic Places in Florida